Bizarro World is the fifth full-length studio album by Deadlock. It was released on February 28, 2011 and was the last album to feature Johannes Prem as harsh vocalist and Gert Rymen as rhythm guitarist who had left in 2011 and 2013 respectively, also it was the only album to feature John Gahlert on bass til he switched to harsh vocals to replace Johannes Prem.

Track listing

Credits

 Deadlock

 Harsh vocals – Johannes Prem
 Vocals – Sabine Scherer
 Guitar, Keyboard, Programming – Sebastian Reichl
 Guitar – Gert Rymen
 Bass – John Gahlert
 Drums – Tobias Graf

 Production

 Recording – Sebastian Reichl
 Mixing – Flo Nowak
 Mastering – Alex Kloss
 Artwork – Sons of Nero

 Guest musicians

 Piano, Programming – Hubert Zaindl on "Paranoia Extravaganza"

References

2011 albums
Deadlock (band) albums